The 2013 Professional Indoor Football League season was the second season of the Professional Indoor Football League (PIFL).  The regular season began March 8, 2013, and ended on June 22, 2013.  Each team played a 12-game schedule.  The top 4 teams in the regular season standings commenced the playoffs on July 1.  The final was played July 8, with the Alabama Hammers defeating the Richmond Raiders to win their first league championship.

Pre-season
The Lehigh Valley Steelhawks joined the league, after playing two seasons in the Indoor Football League.

Regular season

y - clinched home playoff game

x - clinched playoff spot

The Alabama vs. Louisiana game scheduled for May 25 was cancelled after the Swashbucklers declared bankruptcy.  The Swashbucklers played their final three road games as scheduled, however the Alabama game was not made up, as it did not have an effect on playoff seeding.

Playoffs

Awards
Most Valuable Player - Mico McSwain, Alabama Hammers
Offensive Player of the Year - Mico McSwain, Alabama Hammers
Defensive Player of the Year - Anthony Shutt, Columbus Lions
Offensive Rookie of the Year - Thomas Gilson, Lehigh Valley Steelhawks
Defensive Rookie of the Year - Jake Trantin, Alabama Hammers
Special Teams Player of the Year - Armando Cuko, Knoxville NightHawks
Coach of the Year - Dean Cokinos, Alabama Hammers

References

2013 Professional Indoor Football League season